Craig Greenhill (born ) is an Australian former professional rugby league footballer.

Playing career
Greenhill made his first grade debut for Cronulla in round 2 1995 against rival St. George at Kogarah Oval.  Greenhill played in Cronulla's semi-final defeat against the Newcastle Knights that year.

In the 1996 ARL season, Greenhill played in Cronulla's preliminary final loss against Manly-Warringah which finished 0-24 at the Sydney Football Stadium.  The following year in 1997, Cronulla joined the rival Super League competition during the Super League war. 

In the 1997 post season, Greenhill was selected to play for Australia from the interchange bench in two matches of the Super League Test series against Great Britain.

Greenhill played in Cronulla's grand final defeat against the Brisbane Broncos.  Greenhill then departed Cronulla at the end of 1998 and signed with Penrith.

In the 2000 NRL season, Penrith finished 5th after enjoying one of their best seasons since winning the premiership in 1991.  Greenhill played in both finals games for Penrith which ended in defeat.  Greenhill's final year in the NRL as a player came in the 2001 NRL season where Penrith finished last on the table.  His final game was in round 26 2001 where Penrith were defeated 18-60 by Newcastle who would go on to win the premiership that season.

After leaving Penrith, Greenhill finished his career in England with Super League teams Hull F.C. and Castleford Tigers (Heritage № 805).

Trivia
Craig Greenhill was the first player to be sent off in State of Origin football.
Appeared in Conan the Barbarian as an extra; a young boy in Conan's tribe. Greenhill is attempting to become a golf professional in the senior ranks-he will be eligible in 2022.

References

External links
Queensland representatives at qrl.com.au

1972 births
Living people
Australia national rugby league team players
Australian rugby league players
Australian expatriate sportspeople in England
Castleford Tigers players
Cronulla-Sutherland Sharks players
Hull F.C. players
Penrith Panthers players
Queensland Rugby League State of Origin players
Rugby league players from Queensland
Rugby league props
Rugby league second-rows
Wynnum Manly Seagulls players